Bothnian Bay National Park is a national park in Lapland, Finland. It is maintained by Metsähallitus.

The islands in the area have been formed by post-glacial rebound, and the scenery is still in a constant state of change. There are also numerous traditional fishing bases.

The national park is reachable by boat although visiting is only recommended for experienced boaters.

See also 
 List of national parks of Finland
 Protected areas of Finland

References

External links
 Bothnian Bay National Park

National parks of Finland
Protected areas established in 1991
Geography of Lapland (Finland)
Tourist attractions in Lapland (Finland)
1991 establishments in Finland